Wilson Roberto Gottardo, commonly known as just Wilson Gottardo (born 23 May 1963), is a Brazilian former association footballer who played as a defender and the current coach of the Villa Nova-MG. He played in several Brazilian Série A clubs.

Playing career

Club
Born in Santa Bárbara d'Oeste, he started his professional career in 1980 playing for União Barbarense of his native city. He left the club two years later to play for Guarani, then Gottardo defended Náutico in 1986 and in 1987. He joined Botafogo in 1987, winning the Campeonato Carioca in 1989 and in 1990, and joining Botafogo's arch-rival Flamengo in 1991, where he won the Campeonato Carioca in 1991, and the Série A in 1992, before leaving the club in 1993. Gottardo played 131 games and scored eight goals during his spell at Flamengo. After playing the 1993–94 season in Portugal with Marítimo, he won the Série A in 1995 with Botafogo. Wilson Gottardo played the 1995 season with São Paulo, returning for a third spell with Botafogo in 1995 and in 1996. Wilson Gottardo joined Cruzeiro in 1997, after playing for Fluminense in the same year. With Cruzeiro, he won the Campeonato Mineiro in 1997 and in 1998, and the Copa Libertadores in 1997. He left Cruzeiro in 1998 to play for Sport in 1999, when he won the Campeonato Pernambucano, and then retired.

International
Wilson Gottardo played six times for the Brazil national team in 1991, without scoring a goal, including three Copa América games. He played his first game for the Brazilian team on March 27, 1991, against Argentina, while his last game was played on July 13 of that year against Colombia.

Honours

Club
Botafogo
Campeonato Carioca: 1989, 1990
Série A: 1995

Sport
Campeonato Pernambucano: 1999

Flamengo
Campeonato Carioca: 1991
Série A: 1992

Cruzeiro
Campeonato Mineiro: 1997, 1998
Copa Libertadores: 1997

References

1963 births
Living people
People from Santa Bárbara d'Oeste
Brazilian footballers
Brazil international footballers
Brazilian football managers
Campeonato Brasileiro Série A players
Primeira Liga players
União Agrícola Barbarense Futebol Clube players
Guarani FC players
Clube Náutico Capibaribe players
Botafogo de Futebol e Regatas players
CR Flamengo footballers
C.S. Marítimo players
São Paulo FC players
Fluminense FC players
Cruzeiro Esporte Clube players
Sport Club do Recife players
Copa Libertadores-winning players
Brazilian expatriate footballers
Expatriate footballers in Portugal
Association football defenders
Footballers from São Paulo (state)